|}

The Topham Chase is a Grade 3 National Hunt handicap chase in England which is open to horses aged five years or older. 
It is run at Aintree over a distance of about 2 miles and 5 furlongs (2 miles 5 furlongs and 19 yards, or 4,242 metres), and it is scheduled to take place each year in April.

From 1989 to 2001 the race was named to commemorate the late clerk of the course John Hughes.

In April 2012 the race was won for the third consecutive year by Always Waining, trained by Peter Bowen and ridden by Tom O'Brien.

History
The inaugural running of the Topham was in 1949. The Topham is now one of three races run over the Grand National fences at the Aintree Festival, the other two races being the Foxhunters' Chase for amateur jockeys and the Grand National itself. The Topham Chase is currently run on the second day of the meeting.

Winners

See also
 Horse racing in Great Britain
 List of British National Hunt races

References

Racing Post

External links
 Race Recordings (1981-2003) 

Aintree Racecourse
National Hunt chases
Recurring sporting events established in 1949
1949 establishments in England